Turany nad Ondavou is a village and municipality in Stropkov District in the Prešov Region of north-eastern Slovakia.

History
In historical records the village was first mentioned in 1567.

Geography
The municipality lies at an altitude of 172 metres and covers an area of 9.600 km². It has a population of about 402 people.

Famous natives
 Marika Gombitová

References

External links
 
 

Villages and municipalities in Stropkov District
Zemplín (region)